The 2019 Sportsbet.io CONIFA European Football Cup was the third edition of the CONIFA European Football Cup, an international football tournament for states, minorities, stateless peoples and regions unaffiliated with FIFA with an affiliation to Europe, organised by CONIFA. It was hosted by Artsakh.

The goal of the tournament was scored by Sápmi player Kristoffer Edvardsen.

Tournament
On 19 August 2018, CONIFA announced that Artsakh would host the 2019 edition of the tournament.

The Artsakh postal authorities issued on 4 June 2019, a commemorative stamp for this occasion, which depicts as well the flags of participant teams in the tournament.

Venues
The tournament was held in 4 cities: Stepanakert (the capital), Askeran, Martakert and Martuni.

Participants
A total of twelve teams were scheduled to participate, with their seedings below. The seeded teams are Padania (winners of the 2017 CONIFA European Football Cup) and Artsakh, as the hosts of the 2019 European Football Cup. Abkhazia and Székely Land were also drawn as top seeds in Pot 1, based on their CONIFA rankings.

Sardinia entered in 2018 in CONIFA and it was drawn in one of the groups. However, in May 2019, it withdrew from the competition. The reserve team, in case one of the below teams withdraws, was granted to Kernow, but after County of Nice, Donetsk PR and Luhansk PR all withdrew, CONIFA opted to proceed with just 8 teams in 2 groups.

Squads

Matches

Group stage

Group A

Group B

Knockout stage

Semi-finals

Third-place play-off

Final

Placement round

Placement round 1

Placement round 2

Final positions 

Player of the tournament: Batradz Gurtsiev
Young player of the tournament: Kristoffer Edvardsen

Top scorers 
5 goals

 Batradz Gurtsiev

4 goals
 Federico Corno
 Arsen Sargsyan

3 goals
 Shabat Logua
 Markovanbasten Çema

2 goals

 Ibragim Bazayev
 Dmitri Malyaka
 Norik Mkrtchyan
 Edmond Hoxha
 Vilson Mziu
 Niccolò Colombo
 Riccardo Ravasi
 Benjamin Zakrisson
 Samuli Laitila
 Barna Vékás
 Arman Aslanyan

1 goal
 Georgiy Dgebuadze
 Dmitri Maskayev
 Alan Khugayev
 Narek Danielyan
 Samet Gjoka
 Fravjo Prendi
 Andrea Rota
 Stefano Tignonsini
 Kristoffer Edvardsen
 Botond Kovács
 Rajmond Balint
 Kovács Ákos
 Zaven Badoyan
 Vardan Bakalyan
 David Hovsepyan
 Davit Minasyan
 Artur Yedigaryan
 David Manoyan

Player of the tournament: Batradz Gurtsiev

Young player of the tournament: Kristoffer Edvardsen

References 

CONIFA European Football Cup
2010s in the Republic of Artsakh
CONIFA European Football Cup
CONIFA European Football Cup
Sport in the Republic of Artsakh
2019 in Russian sport